= Sultanpet, Coimbatore =

Coordinates: 10°52′37″N 77°11′55″E

Sultanpet is a small town in Coimbatore district of Tamil Nadu state in India.
